Blizanów  is a village in Kalisz County, Greater Poland Voivodeship, in west-central Poland. It is the seat of the gmina (administrative district) called Gmina Blizanów.

References

Villages in Kalisz County

fr:Blizanów